Arvind Sharma is the Birks Professor of Comparative Religion at McGill University. Sharma's works focus on Hinduism, philosophy of religion. In editing books his works include Our Religions and Women in World Religions, Feminism in World Religions was selected as a Choice Outstanding Academic Book (1999).

Biography 
Arvind Sharma was born on 13 January 1940 in Varanasi, India.

He served in civil services in Gujarat until 1968 he went to US to pursue higher studies in economics at the Syracuse University, obtaining a Masters in economics in 1970.  While pursuing the role of non-economic factors in economic development he became interested in religion and joined Harvard Divinity School in 1972.  After obtaining a Masters in Theological Studies, he earned his PhD from the Department of Sanskrit and Indian Studies in 1978.

While at Harvard he was recruited in 1976 by the newly founded Department of Studies in Religion at the University of Queensland in Brisbane, Australia. In 1980 he moved to the University of Sydney.  In 1994 he was appointed the Birks Professor of Comparative Religion at McGill University, where he teaches.

The archives fonds of Arvind Sharma is held at McGill University Archives (MUA).

Bibliography  
The author, editor or co-editor of more than 50 books and 500 articles, his notable works include:

The Ruler's Gaze: A Study of British Rule over India from a Saidian Perspective (Harper Collins Publishers, 2018) 
Hinduism as a Missionary Religion (State University of New York Press, 2011) 
The Philosophy of Religion and Advaita Vedanta (Pennsylvania State University Press, 2008)  
Part of the Problem, Part of the Solution: Religion Today and Tomorrow (Praeger Publishers, 2008)  
Hermeneutics and Hindu Thought: Toward a Fusion of Horizons (Springer, 2008)  
Fundamentalism And Women in World Religions (T. & T. Clark Publishers] 2007)  
Goddesses And Women In The Indic Religious Tradition (Brill Academic Publishers, 2005)  
New Focus on Hindu Studies (DK Print World, 2005)  
A New Curve in the Ganges (DK Print World, 2005)  
Christianity and Human Rights: Influences and Issues (State University of New York Press, 2007) 
The Quest for Serenity in World Religions (DK Printworld, 2007)  
A Guide to Hindu Spirituality (World Wisdom, 2006)  
Hindu Egalitarianism: Equality or Justice? (Rupa & Co., 2006)  
Advaita Vedanta (Ludwig Verlag, 2006)  
Are Human Rights Western?: A Contribution to the Dialogue of Civilizations (Oxford University Press, 2006)  
Modern Hindu Thought: An Introduction (Oxford University Press, 2005)  
Dharma (DK Print World, 2005)  
Sleep As a State of Consciousness in Advaita (State University of New York Press, 2004)  
The Buddhism Omnibus: Comprising Gautama Buddha, The Dhammapada, and The Philosophy of Religion (Oxford University Press, 2004)  
Her Voice, Her Faith: Women Speak On World Religions (Westview Press, 2004)  
Hinduism and Human Rights: A Conceptual Approach (Law in India) (Oxford University Press, 2004)  
Advaita Vedanta: An Introduction (Motilal Banarsidass, 2004)  
The Study of Hinduism (University of South Carolina Press, 2003)  
Hinduism and Its Sense of History (Oxford University Press, 2003)  
Methodology in Religious Studies: The Interface With Women's Studies (State University of New York Press, 2003)  
Modern Hindu Thought: The Essential Texts (Oxford University Press, 2002)  
Women in Indian Religions (Oxford University Press, 2002)  
Religion in a Secular City: Essays in Honor of Harvey Cox (Trinity Press International, 2001)  
Hinduism and Secularism: After Ayodhya (Palgrave Macmillan, 2001)  
Sati: Historical and Phenomenological Essays (Motilal Banarsidass, 2001)  
Annual Review of Women in World Religions, the (Annual Review of Women in World Religions) (State University of New York Press, 2001) 
Classical Hindu Thought: An Introduction (Oxford University Press, 2000) 
The Annual Review of Women in World Religions (State University of New York Press, 1999)  
A Dome of Many Colors: Studies in Religious Pluralism, Identity, and Unity (Trinity Press International, 1999)  
Feminism and World Religions (State University of New York Press, 1998)  
The Concept of Universal Religion in Modern Hindu Thought (Palgrave Macmillan, 1998)  
Neo-Hindu Views of Christianity (Brill Academic Publishers, 1988)  
The Philosophy of Religion: A Buddhist Perspective (Oxford University Press, 1997)  
Women in World Religions (South Asia Books, 1995)  
Our Religions: The Seven World Religions Introduced by Preeminent Scholars from Each Tradition(HarperOne, 1994)  
The Little Clay Cart (State University of New York Press, 1994)  
Today's Woman in World Religions (State University of New York Press, 1994)  
The Experiential Dimension of Advaita Vedanta (Motilal Banarsidass, 1993)  
The Annual Review of Women in World Religions: Heroic Women (State University of New York Press, 1992)

References

External links

Faculty page at McGill (Arvind Sharma)
Audio: Arvind Sharma in conversation on the BBC World Service discussion show The Forum
McGill University Archives (MUA)

Academic staff of McGill University
Fellows of the Royal Asiatic Society
Living people
Syracuse University alumni
Harvard Divinity School alumni
Women's rights in religious movements
Hindu studies scholars
Advaita Vedanta
Neo-Vedanta
Religious studies
1940 births
Indian expatriates in the United States
Indian expatriates in Canada